Samaraweera Weerawanni is a Sri Lankan politician. He was the Chief Minister  of Uva Province  in Sri Lanka from Apr 1999 to Oct 2001 his wife Nalini Weerawanni was the Chief Minister till he resigned from the Sri Lankan Parliament and became the Chief Minister.

References

Sri Lankan Buddhists
United National Party politicians
Members of the 8th Parliament of Sri Lanka

Candidates in the 2019 Sri Lankan presidential election
Chief Ministers of Uva Province
Living people
Members of the 13th Parliament of Sri Lanka
Provincial councillors of Sri Lanka
Sinhalese politicians
Year of birth missing (living people)